Naing is both a surname and a given name. Notable people with the name include:

Given name 
Naing Lin Oo (born 1986), Burmese footballer
Naing Lin Tun (born 1995), Burmese footballer
Naing Win Swe (1940–1995), Burmese writer and poet
Thet Naing Win, Burmese Lieutenant General in the Myanmar Army
Tin Naing Thein, Minister of the President's Office of Myanmar
Toe Naing Mann (born 1978), Burmese businessman
Yan Naing Oo (born 1996), Burmese footballer
Yan Naing Soe (born 1979), Burmese judoka
Win Naing Soe (born 1993), Burmese footballer

Surname 
Aung Kyaw Naing (born 1994), Burmese footballer
Aung Kyaw Naing (1965–2014), freelance journalist in Myanmar (Burma)
Htun Myint Naing (born 1958), Burmese businessman
Kaung Sett Naing (born 1993), Burmese footballer
Kyaw Kyaw Naing (born 1964) Burmese traditional musician
Mai Aih Naing (born 1990), Burmese footballer
Min Ko Naing (born 1962), Burmese democracy activists
Myint Naing, Burmese politician and political prisoner
Myint Naing (artist) (born 1967), Myanmar watercolor artist
Myint Naing (professor) (born 1942), Burmese Dental Professor
San Naing (born 1991), Burmese long-distance runner
Sann Satt Naing (born 1997), Burmese footballer
Soe Min Naing (born 1990),  Burmese footballer
Tekkatho Phone Naing (1930–2002), Burmese writer
Theikpan Soe Myint Naing, Burmese poet
Thet Naing (born 1992), Burmese footballer
Twan Mrat Naing, Burmese chief of the Arakan Army

References